The 2001 Louisville Cardinals football team represented the University of Louisville in the 2001 NCAA Division I-A football season. The team, led by John L. Smith, played their home games in Papa John's Cardinal Stadium. They ended the season with an 11–2 record.

Schedule

Roster

References

Louisville
Louisville Cardinals football seasons
Conference USA football champion seasons
Liberty Bowl champion seasons
Louisville Cardinals football